Air Marshal Martin Elliot Sampson,  is a senior Royal Air Force officer, serving as UK Defence Senior Advisor to the Middle East and North Africa.

RAF career
Sampson was commissioned into the Royal Air Force in 1986. After passing pilot training he flew the SEPECAT Jaguar for 3 years until moving over to the Harrier jump jet following the Gulf War. He was a Qualified Weapons Instructor on the Harrier and flew over 500 missions in Iraq, Afghanistan, Bosnia, Iraq, and Kosovo. He served 3 years with the United States Marine Corps on an exchange tour flying the McDonnell Douglas AV-8B Harrier II and the F-5.

He became air officer commanding No. 1 Squadron in 2004, during that period the Harrier GR9 was brought into frontline service, with numerous carrier deployments and multiple tours in Afghanistan to support Operation Herrick. In December 2008, he was promoted to group captain and became Assistant Head Joint Strike and ISTAR. In 2010, Sampson became station commander at RAF Coningsby as the RAF Typhoon Force Commander. During that time he was deployed to Gioia Del Colle, Italy as a part of Operation Unified Protector and served as Expeditionary Air Wing Commander for the RAF fast jet operations over Libyan airspace. Additionally, Sampson flew 2 seasons with the Battle of Britain Memorial Flight flying Spitfires and Hurricanes.

In November 2012, he was promoted to air commodore and appointed Joint Force Air Component Commander. In 2014 he assumed command of the No. 83 Expeditionary Air Group and the position of UK Air Component Commander. He commanded all RAF operations over Iraq and Syria during Operation Shader.

In February 2021, he was promoted to air marshal and appointed serving as UK Defence Senior Advisor to the Middle East and North Africa. Over the course of his flying career Sampson has accumulated over 3500 hours flying hours in several different types of fast jet aircraft including the Jaguar, the Harrier and the Hawker Typhoon.

Honours and decorations
In 2006, he was awarded the Distinguished Service Order in recognition of his command of the Harrier Squadron during two tours in Afghanistan. On 21 April 2017, Sampson was appointed a Commander of the Order of the British Empire in recognition of his services.

References

|-

|-

Living people
Year of birth missing (living people)
Royal Air Force officers
Royal Air Force air marshals
Commanders of the Order of the British Empire
Companions of the Distinguished Service Order
20th-century Royal Air Force personnel
21st-century Royal Air Force personnel
Royal Air Force personnel of the Iraq War
Royal Air Force personnel of the War in Afghanistan (2001–2021)